St. Patrick's Parish was created as a civil parish in Kings County, Prince Edward Island, Canada, during the 1764–1766 survey of Samuel Holland.

It contains the following townships:

 Lot 38
 Lot 39
 Lot 40
 Lot 41
 Lot 42

Parishes of Prince Edward Island
Geography of Kings County, Prince Edward Island